John Rutherford Land (July 9, 1862 – April 18, 1941) was a justice of the Louisiana Supreme Court from October 13, 1921, to April 18, 1941.

Born in Lexington, Mississippi, he was the son of Thomas Thompson Land, a prominent attorney who also served on the state supreme court.

He served in the Louisiana House of Representatives from 1888 to 1890. He won election to a newly established seat on the supreme court in August 1921.

His brother, Alfred D. Land, also served on the state supreme court.

References

1862 births
1941 deaths
People from Lexington, Mississippi
Members of the Louisiana House of Representatives
Justices of the Louisiana Supreme Court